Henry Cowell may refer to:
Henry Cowell, an American classical music composer and pianist
Henry Cowell Redwoods State Park, a California State Park named for a local industrialist

See also
Henry Cowles (disambiguation)